John of Kastav was a 15th-century Istrian artist, a native of Kastav (Croatia).

He painted the frescoes in the Church of the Holy Trinity, Hrastovlje, which included a famous Danse Macabre. According to the inscription, which identifies the artist as magister Johannes de Castua, the frescoes were commissioned by Tomić Vrhović, the parish priest of Kubed, and completed in 1490.

References

External links

People from Kastav
Renaissance painters
Croatian painters
Fresco painters